Spillerforeningen (or SPF or The Danish Player Association) is the Danish representative organisation for professional footballers. It was founded in 1977, and has approximately 1,000 members, of which 250 are full-time professional players both in Denmark and abroad. The association maintains the rights of the professional footballers against Divisionsforeningen and Dansk Boldspil-Union. Jeppe Curth is the current chairman of the organisation, elected in June 2016, while Mads Øland (in Danish) is the CEO.

The association is a part of the international organization FIFPro.

Presidents
1977: Torsten Andersen
c.1980: Alex Nielsen
1980s: Lars B. Christensen
1980s: Bent Wachmann
1990: Per Frimann
1990: Mads Øland
1997: Mogens Krogh
2000: Søren Colding
2002: Palle Sørensen
2005: Peter Møller
2006: Thomas Lindrup
2016: Jeppe Curth

References

External links
 Official website

Trade unions established in 1977
Organizations based in Copenhagen
Association football trade unions
Football in Denmark